Adamchik is an East Slavic surname  derived from the given name Adam. The Polish-language version is Adamczyk.

Notable people with the last name include:
 Andrus Adamchik, leader of the Apache Cayenne project
 Ed Adamchik (born 1941), American football player

References

Sources
 И. М. Ганжина (I. M. Ganzhina). "Словарь современных русских фамилий" (Dictionary of Modern Russian Last Names). Москва, 2001. 

Russian-language surnames